Pasquale Panella (born 12 January 1950) is an Italian lyricist, playwright, poet and novelist. He sometimes used the pen names Duchesca and Vanera.

Life and career 
Panella was born in Rome. After graduating from the Istituto Magistrale, he started his career as author and sometimes also actor of avant-garde theatre. In 1976, he began collaborating as a lyricist with Enzo Carella, notably writing the lyrics of "Barbara", which placed second at the 29th edition of the Sanremo Music Festival.

In 1983, Panella was commissioned by Lucio Battisti the lyrics of the Battisti-produced Adriano Pappalardo's album Oh! Era Ora; starting from the 1986 album Don Giovanni, he then became the lyricist of the Battisti's following albums. In the second half of the 1980s, he also started a successful and sometimes uncredited collaboration with Amedeo Minghi. His collaborations also include Zucchero Fornaciari, Mina, Mango, Premiata Forneria Marconi, Gianni Morandi, Angelo Branduardi, Marcella Bella, Anna Oxa, Mietta, Sergio Cammariere, Mino Reitano.

Also active as novelist and poet, he collaborated with Riccardo Cocciante writing the lyrics of the Italian versions of the stage musicals Notre-Dame de Paris and Giulietta e Romeo. His surreal and sometimes hermetic writing style has been variously described as dadaist, minimalist, avant-garde and miniaturist.

Literary works 
Novels
     La corazzata (1997)
     Oggetto d'amore (1998)

Collections of poems
     Savarin – Sade (2005)
     TG2 mistrà – 88 lanci poetici (2005)
     Poema bianco (2008)
     "La piazza, vie di entrata e vie di uscita" in Piazze in piazza (2016), edited by Giampiero Castellotti

References

External links 

1950 births
Living people
Writers from Rome
Italian lyricists
Italian male poets
Italian male novelists
Italian dramatists and playwrights